Baron District is a district (kecamatan) in Nganjuk Regency, East Java Province, Indonesia.

See also
 Districts of Indonesia
 List of regencies and cities of Indonesia

References

Districts of East Java